The Kazan Soda Elektrik, full name Kazan Soda Elektrik Üretim A.Ş., is a chemical industry and electric energy company in Ankara 
Province, Turkey producing natural soda ash and baking soda from trona. The company' is a subsidiary of Ciner Holding.

Background
The trona ore deposits were owned by Rio Tinto Group, an Australian-British multinational and one of the world's largest metals and mining corporation. After survey activities, which lasted more than fifteen years, the company concluded that it will be not able to operate the mining of the trona ore reserves there, and sold the deposits to Ciner Holding in 2010.

The construction of the soda products plant began in 2015, after five years of efforts for bureaucratic permissions and financing. The investment budget of the project was US$1.5 billion. The financing of the project was provided by the Industrial and Commercial Bank of China (ICBC), Exim Bank of China and Deutsche Bank backed by the China Export and Credit Insurance Corporation (Sinosure). Sberbank of Russia financially contributed during the groundbreaking phase. The construction of the facility was carried out by the China Tianchen Engineering Corporation (TCC). The facility was completed within two and half years. Kazan Soda Elektrik plant was inaugurated on January 15, 2018, in presence of Turkish President Recep Tayyip Erdoğan, Minister of Energy and Natural Resources Berat Albayrak, Minister of Labour and Social Security Jülide Sarıeroğlu, Ambassador of China Yu Hongyang and many other high-profile politicians and officials.

Plant and production
The Kazan Soda Elektrik consists of three sections, namely mining, processing and cogeneration. While the mining area is located in Kahramankazan district, the production plant is situated within the Sincan district of Ankara Province, northwest of Ankara.

The plant's mining section supplies the processing section with the 
trona solution (trisodium hydrogendicarbonate dihydrat), which is the primary source of soda ash. For this, trona ore, laying in average at a depth of  under ground, is injected with hot water through bore holes drilled, and the dissolved trona is pumped up in the form of trona solution. The plant has five processing lines. The congeneration facility produces 380 MWe electric power and  400 tons of steam.

The annual production capacity of the plant is 2.5 million tons of soda ash (sodium carbonate, Na2CO3) and 200,000 tons of baking soda (sodium bicarbonate, NaHCO3). If all of the production were exported to Europe, it would increase the key glass raw material by around 25%. Around 1,000 people are employed by the company.

The trona ore reserve of Kazan Soda Elektrik is world's second largest. The plant is the biggest soda ash production facility in Europe. With both Kazan Soda and Eti Soda, the Ciner Holding and Turkey becomes the leading soda ash producer of the  world. The soda ash produced has a purity grade of 99.8%, which is the purest in the world. The total annual export value of the products from Kazan Soda Elektrik and Eti Soda will be US$800 million.

See also

Eti Soda, Turkey
Ciner Wyoming, United States

References

Ciner Glass and Chemicals Group
Mining companies of Turkey
Chemical companies of Turkey
Chemical plants
Industrial buildings in Turkey
Industrial buildings completed in 2018
Chemical companies established in 2010
Non-renewable resource companies established in 2010
2010 establishments in Turkey
Companies based in Ankara
Kahramankazan
Sincan, Ankara
21st-century architecture in Turkey